1-Androstenediol, or 5α-androst-1-ene-3β,17β-diol, also known as 4,5α-dihydro-δ-4-androstenediol, is a prohormone of 1-testosterone (Δ-).

See also
 1-Androstenedione

References

Androgens and anabolic steroids
Androstanes
Prodrugs